In Peru, pisco is a "designation of origin" that is reserved for the alcoholic beverage belonging to a variety of grape aguardiente produced in Peru since the late 16th century. It is the typical destillate of this country, elaborated from fermented wine of certain grapes (Vitis vinifera), whose value has crossed its borders, as evidenced by the records of shipments made through the port of Pisco to Europe and other parts of the Americas since the 17th century, places such as England, Spain, Portugal, Guatemala, Panama and United States, from the mid-19th century.

It is one of the productos bandera del Perú and it is only produced on the coast (up to 2000 meters above sea level) in the departments of Lima, Ica, Arequipa, Moquegua y Tacna.

About the designation of origin pisco, there is a dispute between Chile and Peru. While in the former country the product is simply referred to as "pisco", in the latter the label "Peruvian pisco" is promoted for their variety of pisco as a form of aggressive marketing in their national brands, generally with the support and encouragement of the government as a way of improving their national image.

Background 

It is part of the name of the toponymy of various regions of the country, both via Southern Quechua as through other varieties of Quechua, which is often found in the form  and the like.

The Peruvian coast has been characterized for hosting huge populations of birds that feed on the abundant fish, especially in the "Sur Chico". In this area are found corresponding valleys of Pisco, Ica and Grande rivers.

In the valley of Pisco lived a group of people more than two thousand years ago, known for its pottery and, at the time of the Inca Empire, was characterized by its remarkable products potters, called .

Since that time, one of these pottery products were vessels or amphoras, which were used to store beverages of all kinds, including alcoholics. These vessels were called .

Peruvian pisco production

Making 
The elaboration of Peruvian pisco is most dominated by medium-range industry, usually handicraft. This one takes care of the old manufacturing processes and quality, and often does not respond to strictly commercial purposes but a kind of generational pride of Peru. It is a producto bandera del Perú.

See also

List of piscos

References 

Peruvian drinks
Distilled drinks
Appellations
Pisco